Sati Nalaayini is a 1957 Indian Kannada-language film directed by T. R. S. Gopu. The film stars Rajkumar and Pandari Bai.

Cast 
 Rajkumar as Kaushikha
 Pandari Bai as Nalaayini
 H. R. Shastry as Shiva
 M. Jayashree as Parvati
 Narasimharaju
 Mynavathi
 Siddaiah Swamy
 Sharadambal

References

External links
 

1957 films
1950s Kannada-language films